NSOU can be an abbreviation of:

Netaji Subhas Open University A State Open University of India.
National Symphony Orchestra of Ukraine